Ima nade (trans. There Is Hope) is the seventh studio album from Serbian and former Yugoslav rock band YU Grupa.

The ballad "Dunavom šibaju vetrovi" is notable for being one of the two YU Grupa songs sung by the bass guitarist Žika Jelić (the other one being the ballad "Crni leptir" from the band's 1973 debut album). The refrain of "Dunavom šibaju vetrovi", however, is sung by the band's guitarist and vocalist Dragi Jelić.

Track listing

"Zaboravi" (M. Kostić, N. Čuturilo) – 3:21
"Divlja mašina" (D. Jelić, N. Čuturilo) – 3:20
"Mornar" (D. Jelić, N. Čuturilo) – 3:38
"Dunavom šibaju vetrovi" (D. Jelić, N. Čuturilo) – 3:44
"Ima nade" (M. Kostić, B. Telalović) - 2:47
"Vodi me kući" (D. Jelić, M. Kostić, N. Čuturilo) – 4:45
"Moj stari bend" (M. Kostić, N. Čuturilo) – 3:20
"Impuls" (M. Kostić, B. Telalović) – 2:58

Personnel
Dragi Jelić - guitar, vocals
Žika Jelić - bass guitar
Bata Kostić - guitar
Velibor Bogdanović - drums

Guest musicians
Dragan Ilić - keyboards
Saša Lokner - keyboards
Nikola Čuturilo - backing vocals
Vladimir Golubović - drums
Nenad Jelić - percussion

Legacy
In 2011, the song "Mornar" was voted, by the listeners of Radio 202, one of 60 greatest songs released by PGP-RTB/PGP-RTS during the sixty years of the label's existence.

References 

 EX YU ROCK enciklopedija 1960-2006,  Janjatović Petar;  

YU Grupa albums
1988 albums
PGP-RTB albums